Kariv is a small village (selo) in Chervonohrad Raion, Lviv Oblast of Western Ukraine. It belongs to Belz urban hromada, one of the hromadas of Ukraine.

The total area of the village is 4.6 km2, and the population is around 1157 people.  Local government is administered by Karivska village council.

Geography 

History and Attractions 
Archival records of Kariv date back to 1490. 

Until 18 July 2020, Kariv belonged to Sokal Raion. The raion was abolished in July 2020 as part of the administrative reform of Ukraine, which reduced the number of raions of Lviv Oblast to seven. The area of Sokal Raion was merged into Chervonohrad Raion.

The Church of St. Paraskeva (1887, stone) is an architectural monument of local importance.

Famous people 
 Matyuk Viktor Hryhorovych – Ukrainian composer, author of the textbook of science of harmony, priest and folklorist. He is buried in the cemetery in the village Kariv; there is a monument.

References

External links 
 weather.in.ua/Kariv

Literature 
 Історія міст і сіл УРСР : Львівська область, Сокальський район, Карів. – К. : ГРУРЕ, 1968 р. Page 750 

Villages in Chervonohrad Raion